The Museum of the 24 Hours of Le Mans is a motorsport museum located at the Circuit de la Sarthe in Le Mans, France. It was founded in 1961 as the Automobile Museum de la Sarthe. In 1991, it was taken over by the organizers of the 24 hours road race and moved to a purpose built museum complex under the direction of Francis Piquera, the Executive Manager.

In 2009, the museum was extensively renovated. Its permanent exhibition includes over 100 historic cars, many collectibles, dozens of films and archive photographs. The museum tour is organized around six major sequences that showcase the important figures of the 24 Hour race and origins of the Le Mans automotive industry, tracing the evolution of the car in the twentieth century.

With their legendary models of the greatest endurance race in the world, 350m² of temporary exhibitions complete the thematic exhibition.

A visit of the famous circuit of the 24 Hours of Le Mans race is possible.

Collection

Historic cars

Local cars

Modern cars

See also 

 Circuit de la Sarthe

References

External links

 Motor Museum of the 24 Hours of Le Mans

24 Hours of Le Mans
Auto racing museums and halls of fame
Museums established in 1961